Bellahouston Park Halt railway station served the district of Bellahouston, Glasgow, Scotland, from 1938 to 1939 on the Paisley Canal line.

History 
The station was opened on 2 May 1938 by the LMS. It served the 1938 Empire Exhibition in Bellahouston Park. When the exhibition closed in December 1938, the station closed shortly after on 1 January 1939.

References

External links 

Disused railway stations in Glasgow
Former London, Midland and Scottish Railway stations
Railway stations in Great Britain opened in 1938
Railway stations in Great Britain closed in 1939
1938 establishments in Scotland
1939 disestablishments in Scotland